William Sands (May 31, 1923 – September 11, 1984) was an American film editor. He was nominated for an Academy Award in the category Best Film Editing for the film Funny Girl.

Selected filmography 
 Funny Girl (1968; co-nominated with Robert Swink and Maury Winetrobe)

References

External links 

1923 births
1984 deaths
American film editors